The Tolkien Estate is the legal body which manages the property of the English writer J. R. R. Tolkien, including the copyright for most of his works. The individual copyrights have for the most part been assigned by the estate to subsidiary entities such as the J. R. R. Tolkien Discretionary Settlement and the Tolkien charitable trust. The various holdings of the Tolkien family, including the estate, have been organized under The Tolkien Company, the directors of which were Christopher Tolkien until August 2017 and his wife Baillie Tolkien, and J. R. R. Tolkien's grandson Michael George Tolkien. The executors of the estate proper were Christopher Tolkien (died 16 January 2020), who was sole literary executor, and (succeeding J.R.R. Tolkien's lawyer Frank Williamson), Cathleen Blackburn of Maier Blackburn, who has been the estate's solicitor for many years.

The lawsuits below refer to an entity entitled "Fourth Age, Ltd." which was formed in November 2011. Although court records do not reflect this, according to UK corporate records Fourth Age, Ltd. changed its name on 21 February 2013 to Tolkien Estate, Ltd. Its directors include Tolkien family members Baillie Tolkien, Simon Tolkien and Michael George Tolkien, as well as the Tolkien Estate attorney, Steven Andrew Maier, and formerly included Christopher Tolkien and Priscilla Tolkien, both deceased.

Rights to The Hobbit and The Lord of the Rings 

Exclusive worldwide rights to motion picture, merchandising, stage and other rights in certain literary works of J. R. R. Tolkien including The Hobbit and The Lord of the Rings were sold by Tolkien himself to United Artists in 1969, reportedly for a very small amount, and are currently owned by Middle-earth Enterprises (formerly Tolkien Enterprises), inc., a company controlled by Saul Zaentz until his death in 2014.

Legal issues

Film royalties 

In February 2008, the Tolkien Trust sued New Line Cinema, the studio behind the Lord of the Rings trilogy, for £75 million claiming they had not received "even one penny" from the films. A request for punitive damages was denied in September 2008. The case was resolved out of court on 8 September 2009 with the terms not made public.

In a press release, Christopher Tolkien stated, "The Trustees regret that legal action was necessary, but are glad that this dispute has been settled on satisfactory terms that will allow the Tolkien Trust properly to pursue its charitable objectives. The Trustees acknowledge that New Line may now proceed with its proposed films of The Hobbit."

Gambling devices 

In November 2012 in the United States District Court for the Central District of California, Fourth Age Limited, the Trustees of the Tolkien Trust, and publishers Harper Collins Publishers, Ltd., Unwin Hyman, Ltd. and George Allen and Unwin (Publishers) Ltd. sued Warner Bros. Digital Distribution, Inc., a division of Warner Bros. Home Entertainment, Inc.; Warner Bros. Entertainment, Inc. as successor-in-interest to New Line Cinema Corp.; Warner Brothers Consumer Products, Inc.; Warner Bros. Interactive Entertainment, Inc.; New Line Productions, Inc.; and the Saul Zaentz Company, doing business as Middle-earth Enterprises, alleging copyright infringement, breach of contract, and declaratory relief, arguing that the defendants exceeded the scope of their rights.

The suit alleged that by producing gambling and video games using his characters, the parties had ignored the limitations of the rights purchased more than four decades prior in 1969; contending the original licence to Tolkien's works was limited to the right to sell "tangible" products such as "figurines, tableware, stationery items, clothing, and the like", but did not cover "electronic or digital rights, rights in media yet to be devised or other intangibles such as rights in services". Tolkien's estate claimed that the defendants actions had caused "irreparable harm to Tolkien's legacy".

On 11 March 2013, the Saul Zaentz Co. (doing business as Middle-earth Enterprises), the rightsholder for the Lord of the Rings and Hobbit properties, filed an amended counterclaim against Fourth Age for declaratory relief, breach of the implied covenant of good faith and fair dealing, and quantum meruit. On the same day, the Warner Parties filed an amended counterclaim against Fourth Age for breach of contract and declaratory relief.

The Tolkien Estate et al. attempted to block these countersuits under California's anti-SLAPP statute, claiming that Warner Brothers was interfering with their right to petition under the First Amendment to the US Constitution. On 11 July 2013, US District Judge Audrey Collins denied a motion to dismiss, disagreeing that what Warner Brothers was doing was making "disguised claims for malicious prosecution" and wrote "these claims arise out of the parties' divergent understanding of the Warner Parties' and Zaentz's rights to The Lord of the Rings and The Hobbit. They are routine contract-based claims and counterclaims." In October 2015 the Court of Appeals for the Ninth Circuit upheld that ruling.

The lawsuit was confidentially settled in July 2017.

The Lord of the Rings: The Rings of Power 

On 13 November 2017, Amazon acquired the global television rights to The Lord of the Rings''' appendices found at the end of The Return of the King. Amazon committed to a multi-season television series titled The Lord of the Rings: The Rings of Power''. It features stories that are set in the Second Age. Amazon said the deal included potential for spin-off series as well. The press release referred to "previously unexplored stories based on J.R.R. Tolkien’s original writings". Amazon is the producer in conjunction with the Tolkien Estate and The Tolkien Trust, HarperCollins and New Line Cinema.

Christopher Tolkien's resignation 
On 31 August 2017, at age 93, Christopher Tolkien resigned as a director of the Tolkien estate and the Tolkien trust, while remaining as the literary executor. He died on 16 January 2020 at the age of 95.

References

External links
 
Tolkien Trust v. New Line Cinema Corp.

Intellectual property organizations
J. R. R. Tolkien